Guancha is a Chinese news site founded by Eric X. Li.

Guancha or La Guancha may also refer to:
 Clathrina, a genus of sponges also known as Guancha
 La Guancha, Tenerife, a municipality in Tenerife, Canary Islands
 Complejo Recreativo y Cultural La Guancha, a recreational complex in Ponce, Puerto Rico
 Paseo Tablado La Guancha, a sea-front boardwalk in Ponce, Puerto Rico

See also